Gerald Francis Goyer (October 20, 1936 – March 10, 2022) was a Canadian professional ice hockey player who played 40 games in the National Hockey League with the Chicago Black Hawks during the 1967–68 season. The rest of his career, which lasted from 1958 to 1977, was mainly spent in the minor Western Hockey League. Goyer was also a member of the Allan Cup champion Belleville McFarlands in 1957–58. He died on March 10, 2022, at the age of 85.

Career statistics

Regular season and playoffs

References

External links
 

1936 births
2022 deaths
Canadian ice hockey centres
Chicago Blackhawks players
Dallas Black Hawks players
Guelph Biltmore Mad Hatters players
Los Angeles Blades (WHL) players
Ontario Hockey Association Senior A League (1890–1979) players
Portland Buckaroos players
Rochester Americans players
San Diego Gulls (WHL) players
Seattle Totems (WHL) players
Sportspeople from Belleville, Ontario
Vancouver Canucks (WHL) players
Victoria Cougars (1949–1961) players
Western International Hockey League players